In ancient Egyptian religion, the land of Manu (the West) is where the sun god Ra sets every evening. It is mentioned in the Book of the Dead.

References

Locations in Egyptian mythology
Sun myths
Ra